Žito Vardar is a defunct basketball club based in Veles, North Macedonia. They played in the Macedonian First League until the season 2003/2004.

Domestic Achievements

 Macedonian League Finalist - 1997

Notable former players

 Dime Tasovski
 Srdjan Stanković
 Risto Duganov
 Nikolče Petrušev
 Aleksandar Dimitrovski
 Zoran Nikolov
 Marjan Srbinovski
 Darko Zdravkovski
 Goran Veselinovski
 Ivica Blagojević
 Goce Andrevski
 Goce Gerasimovski
 Slobodan Petrovski
 Vlatko Nedelkov
 Zoran Majstorski
 Scotty Thurman
 Steven Edwards
 Micah Aaron Bell
 Ayinde Avery
 Jerod Haase
 Norman Dean Brown
 Thomas Jerome Rivers
 Igors Miglinieks

References

External links
 

Basketball teams in North Macedonia